Probes in Space is a 1975 American short documentary film produced by George Casey. It was nominated for an Academy Award for Best Documentary Short.

References

External links

1975 films
1975 short films
1975 documentary films
American short documentary films
1970s short documentary films
Films about space programs
1970s English-language films
1970s American films